Mária Mališová (born 6 August 1945) is a Slovak volleyball player. She competed in the women's tournament at the 1972 Summer Olympics.

References

1945 births
Living people
Slovak women's volleyball players
Olympic volleyball players of Czechoslovakia
Volleyball players at the 1972 Summer Olympics
People from Brezno District
Sportspeople from the Banská Bystrica Region